Noah Waddell (born ) is an American pianist. He gained national attention as an award-winning 12-year-old pianist playing classical music compositions for patients at a local hospital in Fort Myers, Florida.

Career
Noah Waddell was born and raised in Fort Myers, Florida. At seven years old, he became interested in piano and began weekly lessons in addition to his homeschooling. His father, Barry is a real estate broker and former professional tennis player. His mother, Anita, is a former teacher.

Waddell's career began soon after he started taking piano lessons. He has participated in many competitions, including the annual Florida Federation of Music Clubs competition with over 2,000 competitors. He won first place in the FFMC competition in both solo repertoire and senior concerto competitions in 2013, as well as the Irene Muir and  overall performance award, where he was the youngest winner in over 100 years. He won first place again in May 2015 for his solo performance- an extremely difficult Rachmaninoff piece. Waddell was the overall winner at the event held in May 2014. Waddell has also appeared on the PBS TV Show, "Curious Kids," and has been featured on NBC and Wink TV.

Waddell was one of eight pianists chosen to participate in the Sergei Babayan International Piano Academy at the Cleveland Institute of Music, and he attended the Curtis Institute of Music in Philadelphia on a full scholarship for the Summer 2013 semester. Waddell made his orchestral debut with the Tampa Bay symphony performing Beethoven's 3rd Concerto. He has played several times with this symphony, most recently in June 2015.

Discography
Noah Waddell Classical Piano Masterworks

Philanthropy
As part of the Arts in Healthcare program, Waddell volunteers his time to play piano at the Fort Myers Health Park Medical Center and other local hospitals on a weekly basis.

In 2013, Waddell hosted Noah's Concert for the Kids at the Big Arts Performance Center on Sanibel Island. The event raised over $30,000 for the new children's hospital at Healthpark.

Awards

References

External links
Noah Waddell website

2001 births
Living people
American classical pianists
Male classical pianists
American male pianists
21st-century classical pianists
21st-century American male musicians
21st-century American pianists